Orange Walk may refer to:

 Orange Walk District, a district of Belize
 Orange Walk Town, the second largest town of Belize
 Orange walk, a series of parades held annually by members of the Orange Order